Deepdene was an estate and country house occupying land to the southeast of Dorking, Surrey, England. The remains of the gardens are Grade II* listed with the adjoining Chart Park on the Register of Historic Parks and Gardens.

History of the estate
A hillside manor that descended from earlier Earls of Surrey throughout the Middle Ages to the 23rd Earl of Arundel and Surrey who became the 5th Duke of Norfolk in 1652, it was sold by his descendant the 11th Duke of Norfolk in 1807 to the Hope banking family. Its descent was not straightforward; the family successfully put forward an acceptable stance and level of regal support in the Wars of the Roses, English Reformation and Marian Persecutions, the English Civil War and avoided the ravages of Popish Plot Anti-Catholicism which plagued five years of the reign of Charles II of England such as resulted in the execution of close kinsman William Howard, 1st Viscount Stafford.

The Duke of Norfolk of this family is today one of two people to be guaranteed a seat in the House of Lords, whose family arms appears in the chamber and who has mostly ceremonial roles he is expected to perform, rather than to speak in debates.

At the height of the regency architecture period the house was remodelled by the architect, William Atkinson for banker and celebrated interior designer Thomas Hope, work that completed in 1823; he also developed the grounds in a particular picturesque style.  The house was occupied by his son, the MP Henry Hope from c. 1840.

Between 1836 and 1841 the house was again remodelled, by the architect Alexander Roos, in the form of a great Roman villa.

Latter occupants and demolition
It was let, for a while to Lord William Beresford VC and his wife Lilian, formerly Duchess of Marlborough. Deepdene was placed into receivership and sold in 1917. It became a hotel during the  inter-war years. During World War II it became the home of various offices of the Southern Railway Company mainly the Chief Accounts office which was 'temporarily' evacuated there from London.

Deepdene House was demolished by British Rail in 1967, and in 1969 replaced by an office block designed by architects Scherrer & Hicks. The site has since been redeveloped as a green office estate, and partly sold for private development. Pevsner summed up the demise of Hope's masterpiece as a "disgraceful and depressing story".

Gardens and Terrace

The gardens were laid out by Charles Howard in the 1650s. The diarist, John Evelyn recorded a visit to Deepdene on 1 August 1655:
"I went to Dorking to see Mr Cha. Howard's amphitheater, garden, or Solitaire recesse, being 15 acres, inviron'd by a hill. He shew'd us divers rare plants, caves, and an elaboratory."

John Aubrey recorded a visit in July 1673 and described the garden extensively:
"…the Honourable Charles Howard of Norfolk hath very ingeniously contriv'd a long Hope… in the most pleasant and delightful solitude for House, Gardens, Orchards, Boscages, &c. that I have seen in England… The true Name of this Hope is Dibden (quasi Deep Dene.) Mr Howard hath cast this Hope into the Form of a Theatre, on the Sides whereof he hath made several narrow Walks, like  the Seats of a Theatre, one above another, above 6 in Number, done with a Plough, which are bordured with Thyme, and some Cherry-Trees, Myrtles &c. Here was a great many Orange-Trees and Syringa's, which were then in Flower. In this Garden are 21 Sorts of Thyme. The Pit (as I may call it) is stored full of rare Flowers and choice Plants…
"In the Hill on the Left Hand, (being sandy Ground) is a Cave digged 36 Paces long, 4 broad, and 5 Yards high; and at about two Thirds of the Hill (where the Crook or Bowing is) he hath dug another subterranean Walk or Passage, to be pierc'd tho' the Hill; thro' which (as thro' a Tube) you have the Visto over all the South Part of Surrey and Sussex to the Sea…"

In 1822, the horticulturalist and planner John Claudius Loudon wrote:
"The grounds are not extensive, but are highly romantic, and intersected with walks in various directions, which, with admirable liberality, are at all times open to the public."

Thomas Hope, who purchased Deepdene in 1808, built a mausoleum in the grounds in which both he and his son (Henry Thomas Hope) are buried. Under his grandson, Lord Francis Hope, the property began a period of decline, accelerated by his bankruptcy in 1896. The house was occupied by the military during World War I and became a hotel in the 1920s and early 1930s. During World War II it became the headquarters of the Southern Railway.

Local concerns that the house grounds would be sold for housing development, prompted the Dorking and Leith Hill Preservation Society (chaired by the composer, Ralph Vaughan Williams) to purchase the terrace and garden, which were immediately transferred to Dorking Urban District Council (UDC) in July 1943. Covenants were place on the land to ensure that it was kept "as a natural and peaceful woodland pleasure resort for the free use and enjoyment of the public".

Despite the custody of the UDC, the garden began to suffer neglect and in 1957 the mausoleum was sealed to prevent vandalism. In 1970, the J. Gordon Elsworth Memorial Fund awarded money to improve and extend paths and to provide seating. In the mid-2010s, the garden was restored and was reopened to the public as the ‘Deepdene Trail’.

The Deepdene Painter

Thomas Hope, who lived in the house in the 1820s, was a major collector of, among other things, Ancient Greek pottery. Sir John Beazley, who classified Attic black-figure pottery and red-figure pottery, named an otherwise anonymous painter the "Deepdene Painter" after an amphora that was in the collection of Deepdene House. This name-vase passed from the Hope Collection at Deepdene to the Honorable Marshall Brooks at Tarporley and thence to William Randolph Hearst, who donated the amphora to the Los Angeles County Museum of Art, where it has the accession number 50.8.21.

Notable residents
Residents of the Deepdene included:

 Charles Howard, 10th Duke of Norfolk (1720–1786)
 Charles Howard, 11th Duke of Norfolk (1746–1815)
 Sir William Burrell, 2nd Baronet (1732–1796), antiquarian
 Thomas Hope (1769–1831), merchant banker
 Henry Thomas Hope (1808–1862), MP for East Looe and Gloucester
 Sir William Leslie de la Poer Beresford (1847–1900), Victoria Cross recipient
 Lily Spencer-Churchill, Dowager Duchess of Marlborough (1854–1909), wife of Sir William Beresford
 Almeric Paget, 1st Baron Queenborough (1861–1949), industrialist and politician.

References

Bibliography

External links

The Deepdene Trail

British country houses destroyed in the 20th century
Buildings and structures demolished in 1967
Country houses in Surrey
Gardens in Surrey
Grade II* listed parks and gardens in Surrey
Dorking